This is a list of defunct airlines of Bangladesh.

See also
 List of airlines of Bangladesh
 List of airports in Bangladesh

References

Bangladesh
Airlines
Airlines, defunct